Dražan or Drazan is a given or surname.
Those bearing it include:

 Christine Drazan, American politician from Oregon
 Christopher Drazan, Austrian midfielder currently playing for SK Rapid Wien
 Dražan Jerković, Croatian and Yugoslav football forward, and manager